Nine Lives is a 1957 Norwegian film about Jan Baalsrud, a commando and member of the Norwegian resistance during World War II. Trained in Britain, in 1943, he participated in an operation to destroy a German air control tower. This mission was compromised when he and his fellow soldiers accidentally made contact with a civilian rather than a Resistance member, who betrayed them to the Nazis.

The film was directed by Arne Skouen and is based on the book We Die Alone (1955) by British author David Howarth.

In 1958, the film was nominated for an Oscar for Best Foreign Language Film and was entered into the Cannes Film Festival. In 1991, Norwegian television audiences voted it the greatest Norwegian film ever made.

Plot 
The morning after their blunder, the resistance fighters are attacked by a German vessel. The Norwegians' boat contains 8 tons of explosives intended to destroy the air control tower. The commandos explode their payload, and Baalsrud and some other survivors flee. They swim ashore in ice cold Arctic waters. Baalsrud is the only one to escape the Nazi roundup. Soaking wet and missing one shoe, he escapes up a ravine, and shoots and kills a Gestapo officer.

Baalsrud evades capture for roughly two months, during which time he suffers from frostbite and snow blindness. He fails in his bid to reach the border of neutral Sweden and throws himself on the mercy of some Norwegians who have access to the Norwegian underground.  While hiding in their barn, he amputates most of his frostbitten toes with an ordinary knife, because gangrene has set in.

The fellow Norwegians manage to move Baalsrud close to the Swedish border, but are forced to leave him in a snow cave for roughly two weeks. They made a new plan to get him over the border, having him transported by a reindeer herder, who finally gets him across the frontier to safety.

Baalsrud recuperates in a Swedish hospital for seven months. He returns to England through South Africa, Asia, Australia, New Zealand, and America before rejoining the fight.

Cast
 Jack Fjeldstad - Jan Baalsrud
 Henny Moan - Agnes
 Alf Malland - Martin
 Joachim Holst-Jensen - Bestefar (grandpa)
 Lydia Opøien - Jordmoren (midwife)
 Edvard Drabløs - Skolelæreren (schoolteacher)
 Sverre Hansen - Skomakeren (cobbler)
 Rolf Søder - Sigurd Eskeland
 Ottar Wicklund - Henrik
 Olav Nordrå - Konrad
 Alf Ramsøy - Ivar, kjelketrekker (pulled the sled)
 Jens Bolling - Alfred, kjelketrekker
 Per Bronken - Ole, kjelketrekker
 Grete Nordrå - Stenografen (stenographer)
 Lillebil Nordrum - Sykepleiersken ("Nurse")
 Wilfred Breistrand as a sled puller

See also
 List of Norwegian submissions for the Academy Award for Best Foreign Language Film
 List of submissions to the 30th Academy Awards for Best Foreign Language Film
Nine lives (disambiguation)
 The 12th Man (2017)

References

External links
 
 The New York Times review from 1959

1957 films
1950s adventure drama films
1950s Norwegian-language films
Norwegian World War II films
Films directed by Arne Skouen
Films about Norwegian resistance movement
Norwegian adventure drama films
1957 drama films